White Colombians are the Colombian descendants of European and Middle Eastern people. According to the 2018 census, 87.58% of Colombians do not identify with any ethnic group, thus being either white or mestizo (mixed European and Amerindian ancestry), which are not categorized separately.

Distribution and ethnic background
While most sources estimate whites to be 20% of country's population, the Federal Research Division (using data from 2005 census) puts that percentage at 37%.

According to Latinobarómetro poll, 25% of Colombians surveyed self identified as Whites.

Whites live mainly in Andean Region and the urban centers; they are mostly of Spanish lineage, but there is also a large population of Middle East descent, as well as some Italian, German, and another European ancestry,
 particularly among upper classes.

Genetics

According to a genetic research published in 2014, where the ancestry of five Latin American countries were evaluated, the average Colombian genetic admixture is 60% European, 29%, Amerindian, and 11%, African, with self-identified white Colombians (19.3% of the samples) being 65% European, 26% Amerindian, and 9% African. Colombia obtained the second highest European component after Brazil, the second lowest melanin ratio also after Brazil, the second highest rate of blue/gray and green eyes, with the highest rate of honey/hazel eyes, the third highest rate of blond hair and with the same rate of red hair as Brazil and Chile.

History

Colonial period
The presence of Whites in Colombia began in 1510 with the colonization of San Sebastián de Urabá. In 1525, settlers founded Santa Marta, the oldest Spanish city still in existence in Colombia. Many Spaniards came searching for gold, while others established themselves as leaders of the social organizations teaching the Christian faith and the ways of their civilization.

Immigration from Europe
Basque priests introduced handball into Colombia. Besides business, Basque immigrants in Colombia were devoted to teaching and public administration. In the first years of the Andean multinational company, Basque sailors navigated as captains and pilots on the majority of the ships until the country was able to train its own crews. In Bogota, there is a small colony of thirty to forty families who emigrated as a consequence of the Spanish Civil War.

The first German immigrants arrived in the 16th century contracted by the Spanish Crown, and included explorers such as Ambrosio Alfinger and Nikolaus Federmann. There was another small wave of German immigrants at the end of the 19th and beginning of 20th century including Leo Siegfried Kopp, the founder of the famous Bavaria Brewery.
SCADTA, a Colombian-German air transport corporation which was established by German expatriates in 1919, was the first commercial airline in the western hemisphere.

In December 1941 the United States government estimated that there were at least 4,000 Germans living in Colombia.

A wave of Ashkenazi immigrants came after the rise of Nazism in 1933, followed by as many as 17,000 German Jews. From 1939 until the end of World War II, immigration was put to a halt by anti-immigrant feelings in the country and restrictions on immigration from Germany.

There were some Nazi agitators in Colombia, such as Barranquilla businessman Emil Prufurt, but the majority was apolitical.
Colombia asked Germans who were on the U.S. blacklist to leave and allowed German and Jewish refugees in the country illegally to stay.

Immigration from the Middle East
 

Colombia was one of early focus of Sephardi immigration. Jewish converts to Christianity and some crypto-Jews also sailed with the early explorers. It has been suggested that the present day culture of business entrepreneurship in the region of Antioquia and Valle del Cauca is attributable to Sephardi immigration.

The largest wave of Middle Eastern immigration began around 1880, and remained during the first two decades of the 20th century. They were mainly Maronite Christians from Lebanon, Syria and Ottoman Palestine, fleeing financial hardships and the repression of the Turkish Ottoman Empire. When they were first processed in the ports of Colombia, they were classified as Turks.

During the early part of the 20th century, numerous Jewish immigrants came from Turkey, North Africa and Syria. Shortly after, Jewish immigrants began to arrive from Eastern Europe. Armenians, Lebanese, Syrians, Palestinians and some Israelis continue since then to settle in Colombia.

Between 700,000 and 3,200,000 Colombians have full or partial Middle Eastern descent. Due to poor existing information it's impossible to know the exact number of people that immigrated to Colombia. A figure of 50,000-100,000 from 1880 to 1930 may be reliable. Whatever the figure, Lebanese are perhaps the biggest immigrant group next to the Spanish since independence. Cartagena, Cali, and Bogota were among the cities with the largest number of Arabic-speaking representatives in Colombia in 1945.

See also

 Race and ethnicity in Colombia
 Mestizo Colombians
 Afro-Colombians
 Indigenous peoples of Colombia
 Spanish Colombian
 Italian Colombian
 Lebanese Colombians
 History of the Jews in Colombia
 Immigration to Colombia
 Colombians
 White people
 Basque Colombians
 Arab Colombians

References

Works cited
 Bushnell, David and Rex A. Hudson.  "Racial distinctions".  In Colombia: A Country Study (Rex A. Hudson, ed.).  Library of Congress Federal Research Division (2010). 

Colombian people of European descent
Ethnic groups in Colombia
European Colombian
White Latin American